Elesin Oba, The King's Horseman is a 2022 Yoruba-language Nigerian historical drama film directed by Biyi Bandele and distributed by Netflix, based on  Death and the King's Horseman, a stage play he wrote while in Cambridge, where he was a fellow at Churchill College during his political exile from Nigeria, and it is based on a real incident that took place in Yorubaland during British Colonial rule. The film stars Odunlade Adekola as the titular character, with Shaffy Bello, Brymo, Deyemi Okanlawon, Omowunmi Dada, Jide Kosoko, Langley Kirkwood, Joke Silva amongst others in supporting roles.

Plot 
The film is based on a true story and is set in the 1940s Oyo Town, southwestern Nigeria. The king has just died, and as tradition demands Elesin Oba must perform ritual suicide in order to join his dead king in the afterlife so that the king may gain free passage into the land of the gods, thus blocking disaster from befalling the community. Elesin Oba's sexual appetites cause him to shirk, which leads to a mortal confrontation with the British and with devastating consequences. When the horseman is unable to fulfill his final responsibility, it is believed that the King's ghost wanders the earth, spelling calamity for the land and its people. Also, due to his inability to fulfil his duty, his son, Olunde, takes his place in the ritual.

Cast 
 Odunlade Adekola 
 Shaffy Bello 
 Ọlawale Ọlọfọrọ (Brymo)
 Deyemi Okanlawon
 Omowunmi Dada
 Jide Kosoko 
 Kevin Ushi
 Jenny Stead
 Mark Elderkin 
 Langley Kirkwood
 Taiwo Ajai-Lycett 
 Joke Silva

Production 
The film is co-produced by Ebonylife TV Studio and Netflix and is adapted for screen and directed by Biyi Bandele. The screenplay was translated into Yorùbá, and the film subsequently subtitled into English, by Nigerian linguist Kola Tubosun, a decision described as "one of [the film's] more ticklish conceits"  and “the only way to make the film immediately accessible to a global audience.” The movie premiered at the 2022 Toronto International Film Festival (TIFF) on 9 September 2022  and was released in Nigerian cinemas on 28 October 2022 followed by a Netflix release on 4 November.

It is Soyinka's first work to be made into a motion picture since the 1970 film Kongi's Harvest by Ossie Davies and the first Yoruba-language film to premiere at TIFF. The director, Biyi Bandele, passed away shortly before the movie's premiere, in August 2022.

Reception 
There have been several feedback to the film since its release. The film has been described as colourful and enjoyable The film was also lauded for highlighting the importance of tradition.

References

External links 
 "Elesin Oba (The King's Horseman)", IMDb.

2022 films
Nigerian drama films
Films directed by Biyi Bandele
Nigerian films based on actual events
Films set in Western Nigeria
Yoruba-language films
2020s English-language films